Doyon is an unincorporated community in Ramsey County, in the U.S. state of North Dakota.

History
A post office was established at Doyon in 1900 and remained in operation until it was discontinued in 1993. The community was named for Charles H. Doyon, an early settler.

References

Unincorporated communities in Ramsey County, North Dakota
Unincorporated communities in North Dakota